Mark Albert Beban (3 February 1940, Greymouth – 4 April 2005, Wellington) was a New Zealand cricketer. He played four first-class matches for Wellington in the 1969–70, and is one of the few ordained Roman Catholic priests to play first-class cricket. He also played for West Coast in the Hawke Cup.

References

1940 births
2005 deaths
New Zealand cricketers
Wellington cricketers
20th-century New Zealand Roman Catholic priests